Diamonds and Toads or Toads and Diamonds is a French fairy tale by Charles Perrault, and titled by him "Les Fées" or "The Fairies". Andrew Lang included it in The Blue Fairy Book. It was illustrated by Laura Valentine in Aunt Louisa's nursery favourite.

In his source, as in Mother Hulda, the kind girl was the stepdaughter, not the other daughter. The change was apparently to decrease the similarity to Cinderella.

It is Aarne-Thompson tale 480, the kind and the unkind girls. Others of this type include Shita-kiri Suzume, Frau Holle or Mrs.Holle, The Three Heads in the Well, Father Frost, The Three Little Men in the Wood, The Enchanted Wreath, The Old Witch, and The Two Caskets. Literary variants include The Three Fairies and Aurore and Aimée.

Summary
A bad-tempered old widow had two daughters; her older daughter, Fanny was disagreeable and proud, but looked and behaved like her mother, and therefore was her favorite child; her younger daughter, Rose was sweet, courteous, and beautiful, but resembled her late father. Jealous and bitter, the widow and her favourite daughter abused and mistreated the younger girl.

One day while drawing water from the well, an old woman asked the younger girl for a drink of water. The girl politely consented and after giving it, she found that the woman was a fairy, who had taken the guise of a crone to test the character of mortals. As the girl was so kind and compassionate toward her, the fairy blessed her with having either a jewel, a precious metal, or a pretty flower fall from her mouth whenever she spoke.

Upon arriving home and explaining why she took so long to her mother, the widow was delighted at the sight of precious metals, jewels and flowers falling from the girl's lips, and desired that her favored eldest daughter, Fanny, should have the gift as well. Fanny protested, but the widow forcibly sent her to the well with instruction to act kindly toward an old beggar woman. Fanny set off but the fairy appeared as a fine princess, and requested that the girl draw her a drink from the well. The elder daughter spoke rudely to the fairy and insulted her. The fairy decreed that, as punishment for her despicable attitude, either a toad or a snake would fall from Fanny's mouth whenever she spoke.

When Fanny arrived home, she told her story to her mother and disgusting toads and vipers fell from her mouth with each word. The widow, in a fury, drove her younger daughter out of the house. In the woods, she met a king's son, who fell in love with her and married her. In time, even the widow was sickened by her older daughter, and drove her out, and she died alone and miserable in the woods.

Commentary
The idea of having jewels fall from a virtuous person is a motif found in various other tales, as in the Italian Biancabella and the Snake.

In Popular Culture
In the film Uncut Gems a stage version of the story is performed by students at a high school.

An animated version known as "The Fairy" appeared in an episode of Let's Go Luna!.

Gallery

See also

 Frau Holle
 Jennifer Murdley's Toad
 Kallo and the Goblins
 The Honest Woodman
 The Months
 True and Untrue
 Youngest sibling
 Cinderella
 Father Frost (fairy tale)

References

External links

Works by Charles Perrault
Fiction about shapeshifting
French fairy tales
ATU 460-499